The 2004 WAC men's basketball tournament  was held in the Save Mart Center at Fresno State in Fresno, California.  The winners of the tournament were the #1 seeded Nevada Wolf Pack.

Bracket

References

WAC men's basketball tournament
2003–04 Western Athletic Conference men's basketball season
WAC men's basketball tournament